Nonstop Feeling is the debut album by American hardcore punk band Turnstile. It was released on January 13, 2015, through Reaper Records. The album was reissued on 12" vinyl on September 23, 2016, through Roadrunner Records when the band signed to the label.

Nonstop Feeling sold 1,100 copies in its first week.

Track listing

Charts

Release history

Personnel
Personnel per booklet.

Turnstile
 Brendan Yates – lead vocals
 Franz Lyons – bass
 Brady Ebert – guitars
 Sean Cullen – guitars
 Daniel Fang – drums, percussion

Additional musicians
 Greg Cerwonka – solo guitar (track 3)
 Justice Tripp – backing vocals (track 10)
 Adam Mercer – organ (track 11)

Production
 Brian McTernan – recording, production, sound engineer
 Will Beasley – recording, production (assistant), sound engineer
 Paul Leavitt – mastering
 Jillian Yoffe – artwork, layout, backing vocals
 Evan Wivell – layout, backing vocals
 Matt Caldwell – photography
 Kate Frese – photography
 Kencredible – photography
 Anne Kohler – photography
 Nic Samayoa – photography	
 Danielle Parsons – photography
 Todd Pollock – photography		
 Jesus Martinez – photography
 Justin Gilman – others

References

2015 albums
Turnstile (band) albums